Casper Henriksson (born 3 April 2004) is a speedway rider from Sweden.

Speedway career 
Henriksson became the Swedish Under 21 champion in 2022. He represented Sweden at senior level in the 2022 Speedway of Nations 2 final. Also in 2022, he finished 14th in the final standings of the 2022 SGP2 and won a European Junior bronze medal at the 2022 Individual Speedway Junior European Championship.

In 2022, he was riding for Lejonen in Sweden.

References 

Living people
2004 births
Swedish speedway riders